Hazare is an Indian surname. Notable people with the surname include:

 Anna Hazare (born 1937), Indian social activist
 Sanjay Hazare (born 1961), Indian cricketer and umpire
 Vijay Hazare (1915–2004), Indian cricketer

See also 
 Hazar (disambiguation)
 Hazara (disambiguation)